Hispidocalyptella is a genus of fungus in the family Marasmiaceae. This is a monotypic genus, containing the single species Hispidocalyptella australis, found in Australia.

See also
 List of Marasmiaceae genera

References

 

Fungi of Australia
Marasmiaceae
Monotypic Agaricales genera
Taxa named by Egon Horak